The Jefferson City News Tribune, also known as the News Tribune, is an American daily newspaper published in Jefferson City, Missouri. It is owned by WEHCO Media, Inc.

References

newstribune.com,
wehco.com,
mopress.com/missouri-newspaper-directory-free-edition/2187/jefferson-city-news-tribune/

External links

Official web site
WEHCO Media website

Newspapers published in Missouri
Cole County, Missouri
1865 establishments in Missouri